Patrick Shaw may refer to:

Patrick Shaw (diplomat) (1913–1975), Australian diplomat
Patrick Shaw (legal writer) (1796–1872), Scottish lawyer and legal writer
Patrick Shaw (politician) (1872–1940), Irish politician
Patrick Shaw (cyclist) (born 1986), Australian cyclist

See also
Patrick Shaw-Stewart (1888–1917), British scholar and poet